Grosnez Castle is a ruined 14th-century castle in Saint Ouen, situated in Grosnez in the north-west corner of the island of Jersey in the Channel Islands. Philippe de Carteret held it against the French when they held half of Jersey between 1461 and 1467, but it has  been a ruin since the mid-16th century.

Today, the ruins are open to the public. Furthermore, there are concrete steps that lead from the rear of Grosnez Castle to a small automated signal station; the station platform affords scenic views.

Name
The name comes from the old Norse words for "grey headland" -  - an accurate description of the site when seen from the sea. In time the spelling evolved to resemble the French for big nose. A nearby headland to the west has a similar name, Rouge Nez.

History
Sir John des Roches ordered the castle built around 1330, about the time of the start of the Hundred Years' War. The castle's purpose was to provide local farmers with a place of refuge from French attacks.

The walls are of local granite and are thickest on the landward side. The castle's position on a clifftop 200 ft (~ 60 m) above the sea means that the natural features of the site protect it on three sides. A ditch dug into the rock provides protection on the fourth side. The remains of ruined walls, mostly footings, are still present.

A drawbridge and portcullis protected the gatehouse, which is the only substantial surviving remnant, and would have made it difficult to capture. There are traces of six simple buildings. The castle, though, had a number of weaknesses:
There were no sally ports for counter-attacks; 
Most importantly, there was no water well inside the walls.

The French captured the castle in 1373 and 1381. The castle was probably last used militarily during the time of the French occupation of Jersey (1461–1468, when the French held the east of the island, but loyal Jersey folk held the western parishes). In 1483, after several years of petitioning King Edward IV, the Seigneur of St Ouen - recommended to the King's Grace by his father-in-law the governor, was granted a ″License to Crenelate″ - that is allowed to fortify his manor house. Governor Harliston approved the dismantling of the ″fort of refuge″ at Grosnez so that the already-worked stone could be re-used in fortifying St. Ouen's Manor. The financial savings were important to Seigneur De Carteret, as - when he came into his majority - ″trees grew in the Hall of the Manor because his Guardians had wasted the substance of the Rentes″ i.e. - embezzled the income - and he was investing heavily in renovating the dilapidated manor buildings. His shortage of money was both what influenced him to marry the daughter of the Plantagenet Governor Harliston, and also what led him into conflict with the second governor of the island after 1486. When Matthew Baker was sent to take Harliston's place in 1486, the Seigneur had not paid his taxes to the Exchequer for three years - since the death of Edward IV. De Carteret was already under some suspicion as a Plantagenet supporter - after all - the rebel Governor Harliston was his father-in-law. When King Henry VII ordered a general examination of outstanding accounts by the Exchequer clerks, it was inevitable that De Carteret would be required to pay the back taxes he owed the Crown.  This, then, is the background to the dismantling of Grosnez Castle - and also of the later friction between De Carteret and Matthew Baker.

In 1806, a naval signal station was established at Grosnez to send messages to Guernsey.

Modern depiction

Grosnez Castle appears on the reverse of the Jersey 50 pence coin.

Citations and references
Citations

References
 Dillon, Paddy (2011) Walking on Jersey: 24 routes and the Jersey coastal walk. (Cicerone). 
 King, David James Cathcart (1988) The Castle in England and Wales: An Interpretative History. (Routledge). 
 Hammond, Reginald J W (ed.), Channel Islands, (London, Ward Lock Red Guides, 1970), p. 63,

Gallery

Castles in Jersey
Tourist attractions in Jersey
Buildings and structures in Saint Ouen, Jersey